United We Can may refer to:
Unidas Podemos, Spanish political party
United We Can, Costa Rican political party